Brandon Duncan, better known by his stage name Tiny Doo, is an American hip hop artist, rapper and musician.

In 2014, controversy surrounded his album No Safety after San Diego, California authorities charged Duncan with being part of a criminal conspiracy and thus promoting and profiting from Lincoln Park Blood gang activity described in his lyrics.

Discography

Studio albums
 What It Doo (2006)
 What It Doo, Vol. 2 (2011)
 What It Doo, Vol. 3: Black Hoodie Muzik (2011)
 No Safety (2014)

Collaboration albums

with Tiny Beef
 Tiny 2X (2011)

References

External links

American rappers
Place of birth missing (living people)
Living people
Year of birth missing (living people)
Bloods
21st-century American rappers
21st-century American male musicians